Little Smeaton may refer to the following places in North Yorkshire, England

Little Smeaton, Hambleton
Little Smeaton, Selby